Merome Beard is an Australian politician, representing the electoral district of North West Central in the Western Australian Legislative Assembly for the National Party since 17 September 2022.

Early life and career
Beard is a great-great-granddaughter of Sir Thomas Cockburn-Campbell, the first president of the Western Australian Legislative Council in 1890.

She competed as a rower at the Australian Institute of Sport and went to the 1994 World Championships.

Beard and her husband have owned and ran the Port Hotel in Carnarvon for over twenty years.

Political career
In late June 2022, Beard was selected by the National Party to contest the 2022 North West Central state by-election for them, after incumbent member Vince Catania announced his plans to retire. Her main competitor was Liberal Party candidate Will Baston, with the Labor Party not fielding a candidate.

Beard won the by-election, which took place on 17 September 2022.

References

Living people
Members of the Western Australian Legislative Assembly
National Party of Australia members of the Parliament of Western Australia
21st-century Australian politicians
People from Carnarvon, Western Australia
Year of birth missing (living people)
1960s births